The 1983 World Judo Championships were the 13th edition of the Men's World Judo Championships, and were held in Moscow, Soviet Union from October 13–16, 1983.

Medal overview

Men

Medal table

External links
results on judoinside.com retrieved December 10, 2013
videos found by de.video.search.yahoo.com retrieved December 10, 2013

W
J
World Judo Championship
World Judo Championship
World Judo Championships
J